Art & Crime: Exploring the Dark Side of the Art World is a collection of essays edited by art historian and writer Noah Charney, published in 2009 by Praeger Press.  The collection includes essays by professors, lawyers, police, security directors, archaeologists, art historians, and members of the art trade, on the subject of art crime (including theft and forgery) and protection of cultural heritage.  It was the first book published under the auspices of ARCA (The Association for Research into Crimes against Art), an international non-profit think tank and research group which studies art crime.  All profits from the sale of this book go directly to support ARCA's charitable activities in defense of art.

Summary

Art crime has received relatively little scholarly attention.  And yet it involves a multibillion-dollar legitimate industry, with a conservatively-estimated $6 billion annual criminal profit. (US Department of Justice website) Information and scholarly analysis of art crime is critical to the wide variety of fields involved in the art trade and art preservation, from museums to academia, from auction houses to galleries, from insurance to art law, from policing to security.  Since the Second World War, art crime has evolved from a relatively innocuous crime, into the third highest-grossing annual criminal trade worldwide, run primarily by organized crime syndicates, and therefore funding their other enterprises, from the drug and arms trades to terrorism.  It is no longer merely the art that is at stake.

The book is an interdisciplinary essay collection on the study of art crime, and its effect on all aspects of the art world.  Essayists discuss art crime subcategories, including vandalism, iconoclasm, forgery, fraud, peacetime theft, war looting, archaeological looting, smuggling, submarine looting, and ransom.  The contributors conclude their analyses with specific practical suggestions to implement in the future.

Essays

References

External links
 
 

2009 non-fiction books